The National Shrine and Parish of Our Lady of the Visitation of Guibang (Filipino: Pambansang Dambana at Parokya ng Mahal na Birhen ng Guibang) (Spanish: Sanctuario Nacional y Parroquia de Nuestra Señora de la Visitacion de Guibang), commonly known as Our Lady of Guibang Shrine, is a parish church and pilgrimage site situated at Brgy. Guibang, Gamu, Isabela, Philippines. The shrine is consecrated to the pilgrim image of Blessed Virgin Mary of Guibang.

It is located in town of Gamu, frequented by travelers passing by the Maharlika Highway. It comes alive every year on the month July when religious pilgrims visit to offer prayers during its feast day. The pilgrim image of the Our Lady of the Visitation was episcopally crowned by the Most Rev. Carmine Pocco, Papal Nuncio to the Philippines on 26 May 1973 at the former Saint Ferdinand Cathedral (now Saint Ferdinand Parish Church) in Ilagan City. The Catholic Bishops Conference of the Philippines at its 52nd Annual Bishop's Meeting held in Tagaytay City in 24–26 January 1986 have approved the petition of His Excellency, the late Most Rev. Miguel Purugganan, former Bishop of the Diocese of Ilagan for the Church of Our Lady of the Visitation of Guibang to be called a National Shrine.

The rebuilding of the larger church began in last quarter of 2018. While the construction was ongoing, liturgical services and devotional activities were held in the adjacent Poor Clare Monastery. Built on the same location, the church was expanded from its original 750-square-meter floor area to 1,100 square meters. It can now hold around 750 seats and a full-standing area capacity of around 1,200 people. On 3 February 2023, Papal nuncio Archbishop Charles Brown joined the clergy of the Diocese of Ilagan in the blessing and dedication of the newly rebuilt and larger pilgrim church. The church was declared as the Philippines’ eighth national shrine on 13 February 1986. It is the only national shrine in the northern Ecclesiastical Province of Tuguegarao, comprising the Tuguegarao archdiocese and the dioceses of Ilagan and Bayombong.

References

Shrines to the Virgin Mary
Roman Catholic national shrines in the Philippines